Theophilus Jones may refer to:
 Theophilus Jones (historian) (1758–1812), Welsh lawyer, known as a historian of Brecknockshire
 Theophilus Jones (soldier) (died 1685), Welsh-Irish soldier and government official
 Theophilus Jones (1666–1742), Irish politician, MP for Leitrim 1695–1743
 Theophilus Jones (1729–1811), Irish politician and administrator
 Theophilus Jones (Royal Navy officer) (1760–1835), Irish Admiral in the Royal Navy, uncle of Theobald Jones